Katy Léna N'diaye (born 1968) is a Senegalese-French documentary filmmaker, best known for her documentaries about women muralists in Africa.

Life
Born in Senegal, N'diaye grew up in Europe. She studied modern literature in Paris, and undertook further study in broadcast journalism. She has worked as a journalist for TV5 Monde and RTBF, and lives in Brussels.

N'diaye's documentary Traces – characterized by Elvis Mitchell in the New York Times as "visually sharp and lovingly informal" – focussed on mural painting by Kassena women in Burkina Faso. In the documentary, three old women explain the content of the murals covering the reddish-clay huts to Anetina, a young unmarried woman. Awaiting for Men documented three older women talking as they painted the town wall in Oualata, an oasis town on the edge of the Sahara Desert in southeast Mauritania.

Filmography
 Traces, empreintes de femmes [Traces, Women's Imprints], 2003. 55 mins.
 En attendant les hommes [Awaiting for Men], 2007. 56 mins.
 On a le temps pour nous [Time is on our side], 2019. 67 mins.
 Une Histoire du Franc CFA, 2019, 90 minutes, production Neon Rouge, Indigo Mood, Tact Production.

References

External links
 

1968 births
Living people
Senegalese film directors
Senegalese women film directors
French documentary film directors
French women film directors
Women documentary filmmakers